Hakan Yavuz (born 1 June 1960 in Istanbul, Turkey) is a Turkish professional basketball coach, who is now coaching Denizli Basket.

References

External links
 Hakan Yavuz Interview and Career

1960 births
Living people
Basketbol Süper Ligi head coaches
Galatasaray S.K. (men's basketball) coaches
Turkish basketball coaches